HMS Amphion was a second-class cruiser of the  which served with the Royal Navy.  She was built at Pembroke Dockyard, being laid down in 1881, launched in 1883 and completed in financial year 1885–86, and then lay in ordinary at Devonport.  She was commissioned for the 1887 and 1888 annual manoeuvres.  She was recommissioned in December 1888. served in the Pacific until 1890, in the Mediterranean from 1890 to 1895, in ordinary in Devonport from 1895 to 1897 and in the Pacific once more from 1897 to 1904, having a refit in 1900.

Construction

Amphion was built at Pembroke Dockyard, and completed in financial year 1885–86.

The December 1885 Navy List, listed Amphion at Devonport, with her commissioned and warrant officers borne in the Nanking as follows:

Sea-going career

Annual manoeuvres 1887
Amphion was commissioned for the annual manoeuvres on 5 July 1887, and paid off on 31 August 1887.

Annual manoeuvres 1888
Amphion was commissioned for the annual manoeuvres on 4 July 1888, and paid off on 31 August 1888.  In the manoeuvres, hostilities broke out at noon on 24 July 1888, and ended at noon on 20 August.

In the manoeuvres, Vice Admiral John K.E. Baird's force represented the British fleet, and England, Scotland and Wales were considered friendly to the British fleet and hostile to the enemy. Opposing Baird was the 'Achill' fleet, led by Rear Admiral George Tryon, and based in Berehaven on the south-west coast of Ireland and Lough Swilly on the north coast.  All Irish territory was considered hostile to the British fleet and friendly to the enemy. At the outset Baird's fleet was concentrated on keeping Tryon's fleet shut up in their base ports. They failed.  Both Tryon and his second in command broke the blockade on 4 August, and swooping round the extremities of Ireland, made a descent on British commerce and British ports.

Amphion was part of Rear Admiral George Tryon's 'Achill' fleet.
"The Amphion left Lough Swilly with the [new battleship] , and broke the blockade with her on the night of 4th-5th August. During her cruize in the Channel and up the East Coast of Great Britain she claims the destruction of much shipping; and the capture of the coastguard stations at Scarborough and Wick, also, after leaving Lough Swilly the second time, to have visited Bude with a hostile purpose.

As Scarborough had already been attacked by  five days earlier, her visit there could not have been of much effect, neither does it seem that nay useful purpose was served on the occasion of her visit to Wick, as she was taken there in order that her captain might telegraph to the Achill Admiral through the enemy's wires, an impossible condition in wartime. In no case, according to her log, does it appear that the Rules as to Capture of shipping were adhered to."

1888-1892
Amphion was commissioned at Devonport by Captain Edward G. Hulton on 11 December 1888.  The January 1889 Navy List, listed Amphion at Devonport, fitting out for service on the Pacific Station,  and listed her commissioned and warrant officers as follows:

1892-1895

Amphion was re-commissioned at Malta, by Captain John R.E. Pattisson, on 26 January 1892.  The January 1892 Navy List listed her commissioned and warrant officers as follows:

1895-1897
Amphion laid in ordinary at Devonport from 1 March 1895 to 6 January 1897.

1897-1900
Amphion was commissioned at Devonport by Captain Frank Finnis, on 7 January 1897  She served on the Pacific Station.  She paid off at Devonport on 13 February 1900, Captain Finnis was appointed to HMS Illustrious.

The January 1898 Navy List listed her commissioned and warrant officers as follows:

1900 refit
Amphion was refitted at Devonport immediately after she paid off. On 25 February 1900 it was reported that: "The refit of the Amphion at Devonport is to be completed at the earliest possible date. Although the cruiser only paid off last week she has been dismantled and the work is well advanced. She only recently returned from the Pacific station, and it is understood she is to be sent back to that station to relieve the Phaëton or the Leander, which will complete their three years/ commission in June. The Amphions engines and boilers are in capital condition, although she has served over nine years on foreign stations, and it is believed that her refit can be carried out for £3,000 less than the sum provided for it."

1900-1904
Amphion was commissioned at Devonport by Captain John Casement, on 20 September 1900.  She served on the Pacific Station.  This commission was the subject of a book in the 'Log' series, entitled: HMS Amphion, Pacific Station, 1901–1904. She arrived at Colón, Panama in late December 1900. In January 1902, it was reported that Amphion had struck on a reef while on her way from Panama to Callao, was seriously damaged, and had to proceed to Valparaíso for repairs. In early August that year she was back at the station headquarters at Esquimalt.

The March 1901 Navy List listed her commissioned and warrant officers as follows:

Disposal
Amphion was sold in 1906.

Footnotes

References
 The Naval Annual, various issues.
 Brown, David K.   Warrior to Dreadnought, Warship Development 1860–1905,   published Chatham Publishing, 1997.  
Blueprints
Chesneau, Roger, and Eugene M. Kolesnik, eds. All the World's Fighting Ships 1860–1905,  published Conway Maritime Press, 1979.  
Jane, Fred T All the World's Fighting Ships, 1900
 Lyon, David and Winfield, Rif The Sail and Steam Navy List, All the Ships of the Royal Navy 1815–1889, published Chatham, 2004,

Amphion Logbooks in the UK National Archives

External links

 

Leander-class cruisers (1882)
Ships built in Pembroke Dock
1883 ships